Gennadiy Dmitrievich Tsygankov (16 August 1947 in Vanino, Soviet Union – 16 February 2006 in Saint Petersburg) was a Soviet and Russian ice hockey player and coach. He trained at the Armed Forces sports society.

Career achievements
 Olympic champion, 1972
 Olympic champion, 1976
 World Champion, 1971, 1972, 1973, 1975, 1978, 1979
 European Champion, 1973, 1974, 1975, 1978, 1979
 Champion of USSR, 1970–73, 1975, 1977–79
 Participant of the Summit Series, 1972
 Winner of 1979 Challenge Cup

Clubs
 SKA Khabarovsk 1962–69
 CSKA Moscow 1969–79
 SKA Leningrad 1980

References

External links
 
 
 
 

1947 births
2006 deaths
Amur Khabarovsk players
Armed Forces sports society athletes
Deaths from cancer in Russia
HC CSKA Moscow players
Ice hockey players at the 1972 Winter Olympics
Ice hockey players at the 1976 Winter Olympics
Olympic gold medalists for the Soviet Union
Olympic ice hockey players of the Soviet Union
Olympic medalists in ice hockey
People from Khabarovsk Krai
SKA Saint Petersburg players
Soviet ice hockey coaches
Soviet ice hockey players
Medalists at the 1976 Winter Olympics
Medalists at the 1972 Winter Olympics
Burials at Serafimovskoe Cemetery
Sportspeople from Khabarovsk Krai